The Kinmen National Park is a national park in Kinmen, Fuchien Province, Republic of China.

History
The park was established in 1995, three years after martial law was lifted in the county.

Geology
The park covers an area of 35.29 km² or around a quarter of Kinmen County area. It is divided into five areas, which are Taiwu Mountain, Kuningtou, Gugang, Mashan Hill and Lieyu.

Ecology
Due to its subtropical climate in its surrounding and low human population, the park becomes the place for migratory birds during autumn until spring. There has been 319 species of bird have been sighted in the area.

Types
 Scenic area
 Historical preservation area
 Recreational area
 General restricted area

See also
 List of national parks in Taiwan

References

External links

 

1995 establishments in Taiwan
National parks of Taiwan
Parks in Kinmen County
Protected areas established in 1995